The Wittman DFA aka Little Bonzo is a homebuilt racing aircraft designed to compete in midget racing.

Development
Steve Wittman had started air racing in 1926 using various aircraft. In March 1931, he designed his own purpose-built aircraft in Oshkosh, Wisconsin, the Wittman Chief Oshkosh. After World War II, a new class of Midget air racing was formed with Wittmans efforts. Wittman re-engined "Chief Oshkosh" and renamed it "Bonzo". After several successful races in Cleveland in 1948, a cleaner sister ship "Little Bonzo" was built. The name is a reference to Wittman's much larger racer, the Wittman D-12 Bonzo.

Design
The Wittman DFA is a mid-winged conventional geared aircraft built from a welded steel tube fuselage with aircraft fabric covering and wooden wing construction. The DFA differs slightly from Bonzo with a smaller tail surface, a longer tail and a larger canopy.
In 1968, the engine was replaced with a Continental O-200 to compete under new race rules.

Operational history

Steve Wittman and Bill Brennand alternated flying "Buster" and "Little Bonzo". The aircraft was never transported by trailer and was instead always flown to events, where Wittman would perform aerobatics between heats in his racing aircraft.
1948 National Air Races - Cleveland pilot Wittman placed second.
1949 Continental Trophy races - first place
1950 Rebat Trophy - first place
1951 Rebat Trophy - first place
1952 Continental Trophy races - first place
1964 Reno Formula One Championship - second place 
1973 Goodyear race - the last competitive race for Little Bonzo.
1994 Wittman flew the newly restored aircraft before it was donated to the EAA museum.

Variants
The 1934 Wittman Buster rebuilt from "Chief Oshkosh" was the basis for Little Bonzo.

Aircraft on display
The Wittman DFA is on display at the EAA Airventure Museum in Oshkosh, Wisconsin.

Specifications (Wittman DFA "Little Bonzo")

See also

References

External links

 Interview with Steve Wittman

Racing aircraft
DFA
Mid-wing aircraft
Single-engined tractor aircraft
Aircraft first flown in 1948
United States sport aircraft